The Goa Chitra is an ethnographic museum based in the former Portuguese colony (and now India's smallest state) of Goa. It has a large collection—over 4000 artefacts —focusing on Goa's traditional agrarian technology and lifestyle. Goa Chitra is based in the coastal Goan village of Benaulim. It was founded and is run (2010) by the artist-curator-restorer Victor-Hugo Gomes. TimeOut Mumbai has described the museum as "[o]ne of Goa's most charming attractions" and add that "this little rural complex houses thousands of traditional implements, vessels and tools that evolved over centuries in the agrarian heartland of Goa in the service of farming and other traditional trades".

Collection

Goa Chitra's collection includes examples of local pottery, farming tools, musical instruments, ancient carts and palanquins—from different points of the past. It also showcases an organic farm for the cultivation of various vegetables, herbs, spices, sugarcane, and rice—all staples of the area in coastal western India.

Eco-use

Fertiliser and pesticides utilised are made from farm waste, using traditional techniques.  Rather ingeniously, human waste from the living quarters is also converted to bio-gas, and together with solar power, provides the energy needs of the farm.

Topmost contemporary museum

The Goa Chitra Museum has been rated by the Archaeological Survey of India as the "topmost contemporary museum" in India.

TIME, in a write-up, said: "The exhibits include hundreds of tillage implements, in testimony to a time when agriculture was Goa's mainstay. (Now, tourism and mining are the key industries and Goa depends on neighboring states for such staples as cereals and vegetables.) A sugarcane grinder standing almost five meters high is one of the main focal points of the museum. Gomes took over two years to restore it."

Plans

The museum plans to be a focal point for providing information to its visitors,;  offer workshops for young children from schools and university students offer the opportunity to work with artisans; help artisans with craft development, to make contemporary products based on the inspiration of their traditions which are saleable and help them earn towards a dignified life; and build a documentation-dissemination plan to "guarantee the systematic collection of information about the operation of the project and provide the basis for sharing information with other similar projects."

See also

 List of food and beverage museums

References

External links

Goa Chitra Museum
Goa Chitra Celebrates International Museum Day
M.K. Narayan's Tryst with Goa's Heritage
Goa Chitra, museum of State’s rich past
Goa Chitra launches first heritage trail
Goa Chitra

Museums in Goa
Agriculture museums in India
History museums in India
History of agriculture in India
Benaulim
Buildings and structures in South Goa district
Education in South Goa district
Year of establishment missing